Bader Nasser Al-Huwaidi (born 7 October 2001) is a Saudi Arabian professional footballer who plays as a defender for Pro League side Al-Batin. He is the son of current Al-Batin president Nasser Al-Huwaidi.

Career
Bader Nasser started his career at the youth teams of Al-Batin. He was promoted to the first team during the 2020–21 season. He made his first-team debut on 16 September 2021 in the league match against Al-Tai.

Career statistics

Club

References

External links
 
 

2001 births
Living people
Saudi Arabian footballers
Association football fullbacks
Al Batin FC players
Saudi Professional League players